Robert Abel Arboleda Escobar (born 22 October 1991) is an Ecuadorian professional footballer who plays as a centre-back for Brazilian club São Paulo FC and the Ecuador national team.

Club career

São Paulo
On 21 June 2017, São Paulo signed Arboleda from Universidad Católica del Ecuador in a US$2 million transfer.

International career
Arboleda made his debut for Ecuador on 26 May 2016 in a match against the United States.

Personal life
In his childhood days, Arboleda was fan of international Brazilian players Ronaldo, Ronaldinho, and Juninho Pernambucano. He almost became a policeman before he decided to pursue his football career.

Career statistics

Club

International
Scores and results list Ecuador's goal tally first, score column indicates score after each Arboleda goal.

Honours
São Paulo
Campeonato Paulista: 2021

References

External links
 

1991 births
Living people
Sportspeople from Esmeraldas, Ecuador
Ecuadorian footballers
Association football defenders
Ecuadorian Serie A players
Ecuadorian Serie B players
C.D. Olmedo footballers
L.D.U. Loja footballers
C.D. Universidad Católica del Ecuador footballers
Campeonato Brasileiro Série A players
São Paulo FC players
Copa América Centenario players
2019 Copa América players
2021 Copa América players
Ecuador international footballers
Ecuadorian expatriate footballers
Ecuadorian expatriate sportspeople in Brazil
Expatriate footballers in Brazil
2022 FIFA World Cup players